Alphaproteobacteria is a class of bacteria in the phylum Pseudomonadota (formerly Proteobacteria). The Magnetococcales and Mariprofundales are considered basal or sister to the Alphaproteobacteria. The Alphaproteobacteria are highly diverse and possess few commonalities, but nevertheless share a common ancestor. Like all Proteobacteria, its members are gram-negative and some of its intracellular parasitic members lack peptidoglycan and are consequently gram variable.

Characteristics
The Alphaproteobacteria are a diverse taxon and comprises several phototrophic genera, several genera metabolising C1-compounds (e.g., Methylobacterium spp.), symbionts of plants (e.g., Rhizobium spp.), endosymbionts of arthropods (Wolbachia) and intracellular pathogens (e.g. Rickettsia).  Moreover, the class is sister to the protomitochondrion, the bacterium that was engulfed by the eukaryotic ancestor and gave rise to the mitochondria, which are organelles in eukaryotic cells (See endosymbiotic theory). A species of technological interest is Rhizobium radiobacter (formerly Agrobacterium tumefaciens): scientists often use this species to transfer foreign DNA into plant genomes.  Aerobic anoxygenic phototrophic bacteria, such as Pelagibacter ubique, are alphaproteobacteria that are a widely distributed and may constitute over 10% of the open ocean microbial community.

Evolution and genomics
There is some disagreement on the phylogeny of the orders, especially for the location of the Pelagibacterales, but overall there is some consensus.  The discord stems from the large difference in gene content (e.g. genome streamlining in Pelagibacter ubique) and the large difference in GC-content between members of several orders.  Specifically, Pelagibacterales, Rickettsiales and Holosporales contain species with AT-rich genomes.  It has been argued that it could be a case of convergent evolution that would result in an artefactual clustering.  However, several studies disagree.

Furthermore, it has been found that the GC-content of ribosomal RNA (the traditional phylogenetic marker for prokaryotes) little reflects the GC-content of the genome.  One example of this atypical decorrelation of ribosomal GC-content with phylogeny is that members of the Holosporales have a much higher ribosomal GC-content than members of the Pelagibacterales and Rickettsiales, even though they are more closely related to species with high genomic GC-contents than to members of the latter two orders.

The Class Alphaproteobacteria is divided into three subclasses Magnetococcidae, Rickettsidae and Caulobacteridae. The basal group is Magnetococcidae, which is composed by a large diversity of magnetotactic bacteria, but only one is described, Magnetococcus marinus. The Rickettsidae is composed of the intracellular Rickettsiales and the free-living Pelagibacterales. The Caulobacteridae is composed of the Holosporales, Rhodospirillales, Sphingomonadales,  Rhodobacterales, Caulobacterales, Kiloniellales, Kordiimonadales, Parvularculales  and Sneathiellales.

Comparative analyses of the sequenced genomes have also led to discovery of many conserved insertion-deletions (indels) in widely distributed proteins and whole proteins (i.e. signature proteins) that are distinctive characteristics of either all Alphaproteobacteria, or their different main orders (viz. Rhizobiales, Rhodobacterales, Rhodospirillales, Rickettsiales, Sphingomonadales and Caulobacterales) and families (viz. Rickettsiaceae, Anaplasmataceae, Rhodospirillaceae, Acetobacteraceae, Bradyrhiozobiaceae, Brucellaceae and Bartonellaceae).

These molecular signatures provide novel means for the circumscription of these taxonomic groups and for identification/assignment of new species into these groups. Phylogenetic analyses and conserved indels in large numbers of other proteins provide evidence that Alphaproteobacteria have branched off later than most other phyla and Classes of Bacteria except Betaproteobacteria and Gammaproteobacteria.

The phylogeny of Alphaproteobacteria has constantly been revisited and updated. There are some debates for the inclusion of Magnetococcidae in Alphaproteobacteria. For example, an independent proteobacterial class (Etaproteobacteria) for Magnetococcidae has been proposed. A recent phylogenomic study suggests the placement of the protomitochondrial clade between Magnetococcidae and all other alphaproteobacterial taxa, which suggests an early divergence of the protomitochondrial lineage from the rest of alphaproteobacteria, except for Magnetococcidae. This phylogeny also suggests that the protomitochondrial lineage does not necessarily have a close relationship to Rickettsidae.

Incertae Sedis
The following taxa have been assigned to the Alphaproteobacteria, but have not been assigned to one or more intervening taxonomic ranks:
 Orders not assigned to a subclass
 Minwuiales Sun et al. 2018
 Genera not assigned to a family
 "Candidatus Anoxipelagibacter" Ruiz-Perez et al. 2021
 "Bilophococcus" Moench 1988
 "Charonomicrobium" Csotonyi et al. 2011
 "Candidatus Endolissoclinum" Kwan et al. 2012
 "Candidatus Endowatersipora" Anderson and Haygood 2007
 "Candidatus Halyseomicrobium" Levantesi et al. 2004
 "Candidatus Halyseosphaera" Kragelund et al. 2006
 "Candidatus Hodgkinia" McCutcheon et al. 2009
 "Candidatus Lariskella" Matsuura et al. 2012
 "Marinosulfonomonas" Holmes et al. 1997
 "Candidatus Mesopelagibacter" Ruiz-Perez et al. 2021
 "Methylosulfonomonas" Holmes et al. 1997
 "Candidatus Monilibacter" Kragelund et al. 2006
 "Nanobacterium" Ciftcioglu et al. 1997
 "Oleomonas" Kanamori et al. 2002
 "Candidatus Paraholospora" Eschbach et al. 2009
 "Candidatus Phycosocius" Tanabe et al. 2015
 "Candidatus Puniceispirillum" Oh et al. 2010
 "Tetracoccus" Blackall et al. 1997
 "Tuberoidobacter" Nikitin 1983
 Species not assigned to a genus
 Vibrio adaptatus Muir et al. 1990
 Vibrio cyclosites Muir et al. 1990

Phylogeny
The currently accepted taxonomy is based on the List of Prokaryotic names with Standing in Nomenclature (LPSN). The phylogeny is based on whole-genome analysis. Subclass names are based on Ferla et al. (2013).

Natural genetic transformation
Although only a few studies have been reported on natural genetic transformation in the Alphaproteobacteria, this process has been described in Agrobacterium tumefaciens, Methylobacterium organophilum, and Bradyrhizobium japonicum.  Natural genetic transformation is a sexual process involving DNA transfer from one bacterial cell to another through the intervening medium, and the integration of the donor sequence into the recipient genome by homologous recombination.

Notes

References

External links 
 
 Bacterial (Prokaryotic) Phylogeny Webpage: Alpha Proteobacteria.

 
Bacteria classes